Kolyma Tales or Kolyma Stories (Kolymskiye rasskazy) is the name given to six collections of short stories by Russian author Varlam Shalamov, about labour camp life in the Soviet Union. He began working on this book in 1954 and continued until 1973. The book is considered Shalamov's magnum opus as a writer and one of the most important works of Russian 20th-century literature.

Background

Shalamov was born in 1907 and was arrested in 1929 while he was a student at Moscow University for attempting to publish Lenin's Testament. He was sentenced to three years in Vishera, a satellite of the extensive labour camp system centered on a former monastery on Solovki. He was arrested again in 1937 and sentenced to five years in Kolyma, northeastern Siberia. His sentence was extended in 1942 until the end of the war and then in 1943 he was sentenced to another 10 years for describing Ivan Bunin as a great Russian writer. In total Shalamov spent around 17 years in the camps.

He began to write Kolyma Tales after he was released but it was not to be published in the Soviet Union until after his death in 1982. He was able to publish five collections of poetry during his lifetime, and was well known as a poet before "Kolyma Tales" established his reputation as a Gulag writer. In 2013, the Soviet scholar David Satter wrote that "Shalamov's short stories are the definitive chronicle of those camps".

Stories

The complete set of Kolyma Tales is based on two areas: personal experiences and fictional accounts of stories heard.
The stories are based around the life of the prisoners (political or professional) in the camp and their relations with the authorities. We find accounts of prisoners who have become totally dispassionate, insane under the barbaric conditions, unemotionally murderous and suicidal.

Though he wrote about imprisonment under the Stalinist regime, Shalamov made only one mention of Joseph Stalin in the book, a brief comment on a large portrait of Stalin in an administrator's office.

The book is divided into the five parts: Kolyma Tales, The Left Bank, The Virtuoso Shovelman, Essays on the Criminal World and Resurrection of the Larch.

Publication
The original manuscript of Kolyma Tales was taken to the United States in 1966. Individual tales were published in the New Review between 1970 and 1976. The Russian version appeared in print only in 1978 by Overseas Publications Interchange Ltd in London. They could only be printed with a note claiming that they were being published without the author's consent in order to protect Shalamov. In 1980 John Glad had Kolyma Tales published from his own translations, which featured a selection of the stories. The follow-up book, Graphite, offers further stories from Kolyma Tales.

The book first appeared in the Soviet Union in 1989 and it was bought in bulk by queues of Soviet citizens.

In 2018, the first part of the first complete English edition of the book containing the first three sets of stories was published by the New York Review of Books with translation by Donald Rayfield.  The three remaining sets of stories were published in 2020.

Style
Shalamov attempted to mix fact and fiction, which leads to the book being something of a historical novel. The style used is similar to Chekhov's, in which a story is told objectively and leaves the readers to make their own interpretations. Often brutal and shocking, the matter-of-fact style makes them appear more hard-hitting than using a sensationalist style.

Shalamov said that he considered his teachers not Tolstoy, of whom he was very critical, or other classic writers, but the modernists Andrei Bely and Aleksey Remizov. Shalamov himself thought that after the crimes and key moments of the 20th century, art - and the human being itself - must be rethought, and that writers should find a new form, adequate to it: "In the new prose - after Hiroshima, after Auschwitz and Kolyma, after wars and revolutions - everything didactic should be rejected. Art does not have a right to preach. Art neither ennobles nor improves people. Art is a way of life, not a way of understanding life. In other words, it is a document... a prose lived through like a document."

References

 Golden, Nathaniel (2004) Varlam Shalamov's Kolyma tales : a formalist analysis, Studies in Slavic literature and poetics, 41, Amsterdam ; New York : Rodopi, 193 pp., 
 Shalamov, Varlam Tikhonovich (1994) Kolyma tales [Kolymskie rasskazy], Glad, John (transl.), Penguin twentieth-century classics, Harmondsworth : Penguin, 
 
 Kolyma Tales (Russian, online)

1973 short story collections
Russian short story collections
Short stories about Soviet repression
Censored books
Works about the Gulag